Hey Baby may refer to:

 "Hey! Baby", a 1961 song by Bruce Channel, covered by Anne Murray in 1982 and DJ Ötzi in 2000
 "Hey Baby" (Dimitri Vegas & Like Mike and Diplo song), 2016
 "Hey Baby" (Marty Stuart song), 1993
 "Hey Baby" (No Doubt song), 2001
 "Hey Baby" (Sean Paul song), 2014
 "Hey Baby" (Ted Nugent song), 1975
 "Hey Baby (After the Club)", a song by Ashanti
 "Hey Baby (Drop It to the Floor)", a song by Pitbull
 "Hey Baby (Jump Off)", a song by Bow Wow and Omarion
 "Hey Baby (New Rising Sun)", a 1971 song by Jimi Hendrix
 "Hey Baby (They're Playing Our Song)", a song by the Buckinghams
 "Hey Baby", a 1977 song by J. J. Cale from Troubadour
 "Hey Baby", a 1989 song by Henry Lee Summer
 "Hey Baby", a 2006 song by Melleefresh
 "Hey Baby", a 2009 song by the Jonas Brothers from Lines, Vines and Trying Times
 "Hey Baby", a 2008 song by The Supremes from Let the Music Play: Supreme Rarities
 "Hey Baby", a 2016 song by Bubble Guppies from "Bubble Baby"

See also
 Heyy Babyy, a Bollywood film
 Hey Babe, an album by Juliana Hatfield
 Hey Babe! (disambiguation)
 "Hey Hey Baby", a 1965 song by T-Bone Walker